William Matheson may refer to:
 William Matheson (scholar), Scottish Gaelic scholar, academic, and minister
 William John Matheson, American industrialist
 William Drummond Matheson, Canadian World War I flying ace

See also
 Wilhelm Matheson, Norwegian judge